The University of Engineering and Technology, New Campus, also known as UET New Campus (formerly UET KSK Campus) is an extension of University of Engineering and Technology, Lahore (UET Lahore) located near the Kala Shah Kaku in Sheikhupura District, Punjab, Pakistan. It was inaugurated in 2006 by then President of Pakistan Pervez Musharraf.

Departments 
The campus has the following academic departments:

 Department of Biomedical Engineering
 Department of Electrical, Electronics and Telecommunication Engineering
 Department of Chemical, Polymer and Composites Materials Engineering
 Department of Mechanical, Mechatronics and Manufacturing Engineering
 Department of Computer Sciences 
 Department of Basic Sciences and Humanities
 Department of Software Engineering
 Department of Environmental Science

Degree programs 
The campus offers the following degree programs:

 B.Sc Biomedical Engineering
 B.Sc Mechanical Engineering
 B.Sc Electrical Engineering
 B.Sc Chemical Engineering
 B.Sc Computer Sciences
 B.Sc Mechanical Engineering Technology
 B.Sc Electrical Engineering Technology
 B.Sc Chemical Engineering Technology
 M.Sc Thermo-fluid Engineering
 B.Sc Software Engineering
 B.Sc Environmental Science

Centre for Energy Research and Development 
The Centre for Energy Research and Development (CERAD) is an organized research unit at New Campus, aimed at coordinating and promoting energy research, education and solutions to energy issues of Pakistan. It was inaugurated by then chief minister of the Punjab Shehbaz Sharif on 9 February 2013. The center offers following degree programs:

 MSc Energy Engineering
 MPhil Energy Sciences
 PhD Energy Engineering
 PhD Energy Sciences

See also 
UET Faisalabad Campus
Rachna College of Engineering and Technology, Gujranwala

External links
UET New Campus Official Website
UET Lahore Campus Official Website
Centre for Energy Research and Development

University of Engineering and Technology, Lahore